Events from the year 1677 in England.

Incumbents
 Monarch – Charles II
 Parliament – Cavalier

Events
 16 February – politicians the Earl of Shaftesbury, Duke of Buckingham, Lord Wharton and the Earl of Salisbury are arrested and sent to the Tower of London for challenging the legitimacy of the new session of Parliament.
 February – Nathaniel Lee's blank verse tragedy The Rival Queens, or the Death of Alexander the Great, is performed at the Theatre Royal, Drury Lane, with Mrs Charlotte Melmoth as Roxana.
 16 April – Parliament passes the Statute of Frauds.
 10 September – Henry Purcell is appointed a musician to the royal court.
 4 November – William of Orange marries Princess Mary of York at St James's Palace.
 30 December – William Sancroft nominated by the King as Archbishop of Canterbury.

Undated
 The Baptist Confession of Faith is first published in London.
 The Monument to the Great Fire of London, designed by Christopher Wren and Robert Hooke is completed.
 Chapel of Emmanuel College, Cambridge, designed by Wren.
 Elias Ashmole gifts the collection that begins the Ashmolean Museum to the University of Oxford.
 The John Roan School is established in Greenwich, London.
 Robert Plot publishes The Natural History of Oxford-shire, being an essay toward the natural history of England, in which he describes the fossilised femur of a human giant, now known to be from the dinosaur Megalosaurus.
 Fabian Stedman publishes Tintinnalogia, or, the Art of Ringing.

Births
 17 September – Stephen Hales, physiologist, chemist and inventor (died 1761)
 17 November – Sir Francis Boynton, Member of Parliament (died 1739)
 Whitmore Acton, Member of Parliament (died 1732)
 Elizabeth Wardlaw, writer (died 1727)

Deaths
 4 May – Isaac Barrow, mathematician (born 1630)
 20 May – George Digby, 2nd Earl of Bristol, statesman (born 1612)
 August – Matthew Locke, composer (born 1621)
 27 August – Richard Sackville, 5th Earl of Dorset, Earl (born 1622)
 11 September – James Harrington, political philosopher (born 1611)
 14 October – Francis Glisson, physician, anatomist and writer (born 1597)
 2 November – Robert Sidney, 2nd Earl of Leicester, Earl (born 1595)
 Ralph Bankes, Member of Parliament (born 1631)
 Thomas Manton, theologian (born 1620)
 Gilbert Sheldon, Archbishop of Canterbury (born 1598)

References

 
Years of the 17th century in England